Honduras football Biography
Johnny Josué Calderón Guity (born 26 July 1983) is a Honduran football player who most recently played for Real España in the Honduran National League.

Club career
He previously played for Vida and Olimpia and joined Real España in summer 2011.

International career
He made his debut for Honduras in a February 2008 friendly match against Paraguay and has earned a total of 2 caps, scoring no goals.

References

External links 

1983 births
Living people
People from La Ceiba
Association football midfielders
Honduran footballers
Honduras international footballers
C.D.S. Vida players
C.D. Olimpia players
Real C.D. España players
Liga Nacional de Fútbol Profesional de Honduras players